Jesús Manuel Rodríguez Escorcia (born 27 October 1993), known as Jesús Rodríguez, is a Colombian footballer who plays as a forward for Categoría Primera B club Atlético on loan from Junior.

References

1993 births
Living people
Colombian footballers
Categoría Primera A players
Atlético Junior footballers
Barranquilla F.C. footballers
Llaneros F.C. players
Association football forwards
People from Atlántico Department